Through the Looking-Glass is an 1871 work of children's literature by Lewis Carroll, the sequel to Alice's Adventures in Wonderland.  Through the Looking Glass or Thru the Looking Glass may also refer to:

Adaptations of Carroll's work

 Alice Through the Looking Glass (1966 film), live action musical featuring Jack Palance as the Jabberwock
 Alice through the Looking Glass (1998 film), live action adaptation featuring Kate Beckinsale as Alice
 Through the Looking Glass (opera), a 2008 operatic adaptation by Alan John
 Alice Through the Looking Glass (2016 film), a 2016 adaptation blending live action and digital animation

Film and television
 Through the Looking Glass (film), a 1976 film by Jonas Middleton
 "Through the Looking Glass" (Star Trek: Deep Space Nine), a 1995 episode of Star Trek: Deep Space Nine
 "Through the Looking Glass" (Farscape), a 1999 episode of Farscape
 "Through the Looking Glass", a 2000 episode of Level 9
 "Through the Looking Glass" (Angel), a 2001 episode of Angel
 "Through the Looking Glass" (Lost), a 2007 episode of Lost
 "Through the Looking Glass and What Walter Found There" (Fringe), a 2012 episode of Fringe
 "Through the Looking Glass", a 2012 episode of Criminal Minds.
 "Through the Looking-Glass" (Batwoman), a 2020 episode of Batwoman

Music recordings

Albums
 Thru the Looking Glass (album), an album by Space Tribe
 Through the Looking Glass (Dom & Roland album)
 Through the Looking Glass (Jefferson Airplane album)
 Through the Looking Glass (Siouxsie and the Banshees album)
 Through the Looking Glass (Toto album)
 Through the Looking Glass, an album by Shadowland
 Through the Looking Glass, an album by Midori Takada

Songs
 "Through the Looking Glass", a song by The Libertines from Legs 11
 "Through the Looking Glass", a song by Machinae Supremacy from Redeemer
 "Through the Looking Glass", a song by The Monkees from Instant Replay
 "Through the Looking Glass", a 1974 song by Mott the Hoople from The Hoople
 "Through the Looking-Glass", a song by Rublood from Star Vampire
 "Through the Looking Glass (Part I, II, III)", a 1998 song by Symphony X from Twilight in Olympus
 "Through the Looking Glass", a 2008 song by For the Fallen Dreams from Changes
 "Through the Looking Glass", a song by Chromatics from Closer to Grey

Computers and Technology

Software
 Through the Looking Glass (video game), a video game written by Steve Capps for the Apple Lisa and Macintosh

See also
 Into the Looking Glass, a 2007 military science fiction novel by John Ringo
 Looking Glass (disambiguation)
 Thru the Mirror, a 1936 animated short film starring Mickey Mouse